Danubia refers to a loosely defined region that roughly coincides with the Danube river basin in Central and Eastern Europe. It stretches from the Black Forest of Germany in the west to the Black Sea in the east, covering parts of twenty countries. Historically, Danubia has been owned by the Austro-Hungarian Empire (Until 1918). Now it is split among Austria, Slovakia, Hungary, Czech Republic, Poland, Ukraine, Italy, Slovenia, Serbia, Bulgaria, Croatia and Bosnia Herzegovina.

See also
Danube 21 Euroregion

Danube basin
Regions of Europe